Kaine Manihera (born 25 December 1986 in Christchurch, New Zealand) is a professional rugby league footballer who currently plays for the Northern Pride in the Queensland Cup.

Playing career
Manihera made a handful of appearances for the Brisbane Broncos in the National Rugby League as well as the Burleigh Bears in the Queensland Cup competition. He scored his first try for the Broncos in round 19 of NRL season 2008 against the North Queensland Cowboys in Townsville.

Representative career
Manihera played for the New Zealand Māori in 2005 and again in 2010 against England. In 2010 he was the only non-Super League or National Rugby League player to be named in the side.

References

External links
Brisbane Broncos profile
Rugby League Project stats
Redcliffe Dolphins profile

1986 births
New Zealand rugby league players
New Zealand Māori rugby league players
New Zealand Māori rugby league team players
Brisbane Broncos players
Redcliffe Dolphins players
Burleigh Bears players
Canterbury rugby league team players
Northern Pride RLFC players
Rugby league wingers
New Zealand expatriate rugby league players
Expatriate rugby league players in Australia
New Zealand expatriate sportspeople in Australia
Rugby league players from Christchurch
Living people